The 1927 Geneva Covenanters football team was an American football team that represented Geneva College as a member of the Tri-State Conference during the 1927 college football season. Led by Bo McMillin in his third and final year as head coach, the team compiled an overall record of 8–0–1 with a mark of 4–0 in conference play, winning the Tri-State title.

Schedule

References

Geneva
Geneva Golden Tornadoes football seasons
College football undefeated seasons
Geneva Covenanters football